Andreas Klein is a German-born classical pianist, pedagogue, and recording engineer/producer for classical music. Donal Hanahan of the New York Times declared him “A fascinating artist with all the indispensable qualities: temperament, taste, touch, tone, the four T’s of pianism” and “A pianist who makes silences sound like music”.

Early life

Andreas Klein was born in Berlin, Germany, and attended the Evangelisches Gymnasium zum Grauen Kloster (a private, church-related school with emphasis on the humanities and old languages) completing with the High School Diploma. 

His first piano teacher, Elisabeth Dounias-Sindermann, became an important mentor providing opportunities for him to perform in the annual Steinway Piano Competitions in Berlin and in major halls in his native city, such as Hochschule für Musik and Philharmonie. During 1956 and 1966 Klein was awarded many first prizes the Steinway Piano Competitions in his age group. In 1963 he performed Beethoven’s Piano Concerto N.3 with the Berlin Sinfonisches Orchester at the Hochschule für Musik Concert Hall, and in 1967 presented his first solo recital at the same venue performing, among other works, Mussorgsky’s Pictures at an Exhibition.

In 1970 he was chosen to participate in the annual summer seminar of pianist Nikita Magaloff at the Geneva Conservatory, Switzerland.

In 1972, Klein came to New York to study at Juilliard School and graduated with the Postgraduate Diploma in 1974. In 1975 he made his New York debut at Carnegie Recital Hall after which Allen Hughes of the New York Times commented: “…his technical skills, musical authority and interpretive intensity made his performances compelling at all times, and he seemed well on the way to artistic maturity”. His debut recording for the Apollo label was distributed in 1984, featuring the Chopin Preludes opus 28.

Career

Klein was piano faculty member of Texas Christian University in Fort Worth, Texas, between 1981 and 1985, and moved to Houston, Texas, in 1986 to enroll at the Shepherd School of Music, Rice University, towards studying for the doctoral degree as student of John Perry. In 1989, Klein wrote his dissertation, The Chopin Etudes: an indispensable pedagogical tool for developing piano technique, and was awarded the Doctoral of Musical Art degree.

Having shown great interest for recording technology, Klein began recording concerts and other artists and ensembles in halls since 1987 when he started an independent audio recording service, Ultimo Productions.

During the academic year 1989-90, he was Visiting Professor at Shenandoah University, Winchester, Virginia, where he presented several masterclasses for advanced piano students.

His career as orchestra soloist and recitalist has taken him to the world's most prestigious venues: from London's Wigmore Hall, Berlin’s Philharmonic Hall, New York's Carnegie Hall and Alice Tully Hall, to Washington, DC’s Kennedy Center. He gained critical acclaim for his performances in major cities such as Berlin, Rome, Milan, Bern, Leipzig, Dresden, New York, Los Angeles, Chicago, Washington DC, Cleveland, and Mexico City. Andreas Klein tours extensively throughout the United States, Canada, Europe and Mexico, but also has been to such far places as Damascus, Syria, and Yerevan, Armenia.

As a chamber musician, his collaborations include some of the finest ensembles. He performed Mozart’s Concerto KV415 and the string orchestra version of Beethoven Concerto No.4 with the Salzburg Chamber Soloists throughout the US and in Mexico. Highlights of the 20 city tour included appearances at Stanford University; Tuckerman Hall in Worcester, MA; Newman Center in Denver; Touhill Performing Arts Center in St. Louis; and in Sala Nezahuolkoyotl and the Festival de Mexico en el Centro Historico, Mexico City. Of his Mozart Concerto KV414 performance with the Festival Strings of Luzerne (Switzerland) at the Kennedy Center in Washington DC, the Washington Post wrote: “Intelligent soloist Andreas Klein’s articulate and flowing pianism nicely matched the orchestra’s sound in this crystalline work”. This 10 city tour included major concert halls such as Philadelphia’s Kimmel Center; Spivey Hall near Atlanta; the Wortham Center in Houston; and Mechanics Hall Worcester, MA.  Andreas Klein joined Cuarteto Casals performing Schumann’s Piano Quintet on a US tour and at the Casals Festival in Puerto Rico, and with the Austrian Minetti Quartet he performed Mozart’s Concerto KV414 which was video-streamed from New York City. A second concert tour in 2015 with the Salzburg Chamber Soloists, brought him to venues in Colombia, Peru, Chile, Argentina and Brazil, performing the 4th Piano Concerto by Beethoven within 2 weeks. 

Highlights from recent seasons include orchestra appearances at the Chautauqua Festival and the Most Arts Festival and as soloist performing Bach Concerto BWV1052 in a program, Homage to Glenn Gould, with the Minguet String Quartet on their US and Canada Tour. He brought the house down at Le Poisson Rouge in New York City with two contrasting works: Schubert’s Wanderer Fantasy and the Bach’s Italian Concerto. His recitals at Mexico’s International Piano Festival in Torreon and Monterey, in San Miguel De Allende and at the Festival Paiz in Guatemala were a success and at the Ravinia Festival he received standing ovations.

Andreas Klein has been a frequent guest on WGBH Boston, APR in St. Paul, WFMT Chicago and KUHF in Houston. His recital at the LA County Museum in Los Angeles was broadcast live. He was the subject of a “Musicians Portrait” in Germany and "Intermezzo with Andreas Klein" was televised by PBS.

His CD discs, Piano Sonatas, and the Beethoven and Berg album garnered critical acclaim: Klein always lets the music speak for itself (CD Choice, UK). Deutschland Sender and DS Kultur Radio in Berlin recorded works by Busoni, Ginastera and Stravinsky for their archives.

As Audio Producer and Engineer for classical music, Andreas Klein held positions as Director of Audio Recordings at the Peninsula Music Festival in Wisconsin (2005 and 2006) and at the Brevard Music Festival (2007). His recordings of live concerts at those festivals were broadcast on NPR affiliate radio stations. in 2018 and 2022, he was Audio Producer for the International Violin Competition in Indianapolis receiving an Emmy nomination in 2020 for his recordings and live streaming. Some of his audio productions are distributed by the Naxos, Marquis and Azica labels. His own piano recordings can be heard on SoundCloud, Spotify, Amazon, iTunes, Napster, Deezer. 

Andreas Klein has a YouTube Channel for live concert video recordings and educational projects introducing piano repertoire and discussing piano related topics.

References

American classical pianists
Male classical pianists
American male pianists
Rice University alumni
Living people
Year of birth missing (living people)
Musicians from Berlin
21st-century classical pianists
21st-century American male musicians
21st-century American pianists